Regina Orioli (born 15 May 1977) is an Italian actress who is best known for her role as Lenni, a young lesbian in the 2001 Italian crime film Gasoline.

Selected filmography
Ovosodo (1997)
Gallo cedrone (1998)
The Anto War (1999)
Almost Blue (2000)
The Last Kiss (2001)
Gasoline (2001)
Amici come prima (2018)

References

External links

1977 births
Living people
Actresses from Rome
Italian film actresses
20th-century Italian actresses
21st-century Italian actresses